Frederick Cecil Bartholomew (March 28, 1924 – January 23, 1992), known for his acting work as Freddie Bartholomew, was an English-American child actor. One of the most famous child actors of all time, he became very popular in 1930s Hollywood films. His most famous starring roles are in Captains Courageous (1937) and Little Lord Fauntleroy (1936).
 
He was born in London, and for the title role of MGM's David Copperfield (1935), he emigrated to the United States at the age of 10 in 1934, living there the rest of his life.  He became an American citizen in 1943 following World War II military service.

Despite his great success and acclaim following David Copperfield, his childhood film stardom was marred by nearly constant legal battles and payouts, which eventually took a huge toll on both his finances and his career. In adulthood, after World War II service, his film career dwindled rapidly, and he switched from performing to directing and producing in the medium of television.

Biography

Early life
Bartholomew was born Frederick Cecil Bartholomew in March 1924 in Harlesden in the borough of Willesden, Middlesex, London. His parents were Cecil Llewellyn Bartholomew, a wounded World War I veteran who became a minor civil servant after the war, and Lilian May Clarke Bartholomew. By the age of three, Freddie was living in Warminster, a town in Wiltshire in southwest England, in his paternal grandparents' home. He lived under the care of his aunt "Cissie", Millicent Mary Bartholomew, who raised him and became his surrogate mother. Bartholomew was educated at Lord Weymouth's Grammar School in Warminster, and by his Aunt Cissie.

Child star

From England to Hollywood
In Warminster, Bartholomew was a precocious actor and was reciting and performing from age three. By age five he was a popular Warminster celebrity, the "boy wonder elocutionist", reciting poems, prose, and selections from various plays, including Shakespeare. He sang and danced as well. His first film role came by the age of six, in 1930.

He also pursued acting studies at the Italia Conti Academy of Theatre Arts in London, and appeared in a total of four minor British films. American filmmakers George Cukor and David O. Selznick saw him on a 1934 scouting trip to London and chose him for the young title role in their MGM film David Copperfield (1935). Bartholomew and his aunt emigrated to the United States in August 1934, and MGM gave him a seven-year contract.

David Copperfield, which also featured Basil Rathbone, Maureen O'Sullivan, W. C. Fields, and Lionel Barrymore, was a success, and made Bartholomew an overnight star. He  was subsequently cast in a succession of film productions with some of the most popular stars of the day. Among his successes of the 1930s were Anna Karenina (1935) with Greta Garbo and Fredric March; Professional Soldier (1935) with Victor McLaglen and Gloria Stuart; Little Lord Fauntleroy (1936) with Dolores Costello and C. Aubrey Smith; Lloyd's of London (1937) with Madeleine Carroll and Tyrone Power; The Devil is a Sissy (1936) with Mickey Rooney and Jackie Cooper; and Captains Courageous (1937) with Spencer Tracy.

Captains Courageous was the movie he most enjoyed working on. The film took an entire year to make, and much of it was shot off the coasts of Florida and Catalina Island, California. He later recalled, "For a kid, it was like one long outing. Spencer Tracy, Lionel Barrymore, Mickey Rooney, Melvyn Douglas and I – we all grew very close toward one another in those 12 months. When the shooting was finished, we cried like a bunch of babies as we said our goodbyes."

His acting skills, open and personable presence, emotional range, refined English diction, and angelic looks made him a box-office favorite. He quickly became the second-highest-paid child movie star after Shirley Temple. Ring Lardner Jr. had high praise for him, saying of his performance as the star of Little Lord Fauntleroy, "He is on the screen almost constantly, and his performance is a valid characterization, which is almost unique in a child actor, and, indeed, in three fourths of adult motion-picture stars." Of his role as the protagonist of Captains Courageous, Frank Nugent of the New York Times wrote, "Young Master Bartholomew ... plays Harvey faultlessly."

By April 1936, following the very popular Little Lord Fauntleroy, Bartholomew's success and level of fame caused his long-estranged birth parents to attempt to gain custody of him and his fortune. A legal battle of nearly seven years ensued, resulting in nearly all the wealth that Bartholomew amassed being spent on attorneys' and court fees, and payouts to his birth parents and two sisters.

MGM contract troubles
The extreme financial drain of his birth parents' ongoing custody battles prompted Bartholomew's aunt to demand a raise in his salary from MGM in July 1937, leveraged by the huge success of Captains Courageous. She threatened to break his MGM contract in order to find a better-paying studio. The contract battle kept him out of work for a year, causing among other things the postponement and eventual loss of his planned lead in a film of Rudyard Kipling's Kim, and the loss of his planned lead in Thoroughbreds Don't Cry with Judy Garland and Mickey Rooney.

He eventually resumed acting through 1942, in mostly lesser-quality films and roles, only three out of 11 of which were with MGM, and after 1938 he was less popular than in his heyday. This fall in popularity stemmed not only from the quality of the roles and his conflicts with MGM, but also from the fact that by late 1938 he was a tall, nearly 6-foot teenager, and the fact that the world was focusing on the growing problems of World War II and therefore the literary classics and costume dramas Bartholomew excelled at were less in fashion.

In 1938, Twentieth Century Fox hired him for the lead in their film of Robert Louis Stevenson's Kidnapped. MGM then re-teamed him for the fourth and fifth times with Mickey Rooney in Lord Jeff (1938) and A Yank at Eton (1942), and he co-starred with Judy Garland in the lightweight MGM musical Listen, Darling in 1938.

In 1939 Universal re-teamed him for the third and fourth times with Jackie Cooper in The Spirit of Culver and Two Bright Boys. For RKO distribution, he performed in Swiss Family Robinson and Tom Brown's School Days in 1940. And as World War II deepened, Columbia had him star in three military-related films: Naval Academy (1941), Cadets on Parade (1942), and Junior Army (1942).

World War II and beyond

Enlistment and aftermath
World War II military service interrupted Bartholomew's career even further. He enlisted in the U.S. Army Air Forces on January 13, 1943, at the age of 18, and worked in aircraft maintenance. During training he fell and injured his back, was hospitalized for seven months, and was discharged on January 12, 1944.

He had one film role in 1944, in the low-budget comedy The Town Went Wild. The film reunited him with Jimmy Lydon, with whom he had starred in Tom Brown's School Days,  Naval Academy, and Cadets on Parade. This ended up being Bartholomew's penultimate film performance, and his last for seven years. His efforts to revive his film career were unsuccessful; and efforts performing in regional theaters and vaudeville did not spark a comeback either.

After distressing experiences including a devastating auto accident and performing unsuccessfully in a play in Los Angeles, in 1946 Bartholomew married publicist Maely Daniele. Daniele, six years his senior, was a twice-divorced woman, and his marriage to her caused a serious and permanent rift with his aunt, who moved back to England. The marriage was not a happy one.

In 1946 he was in a radio play in an episode of Inner Sanctum Mystery. In 1947, he appeared as himself in a five-minute cameo in the otherwise all-black musical film Sepia Cinderella, relating his post-war efforts to have a successful vaudeville routine and telling a few gags onscreen. He spent most of 1948 touring small American theaters, and in November 1948 left without his wife for an Australian tour as a night-club singing, patter, and piano act.

Switch to television and off-camera work
Upon his return to the United States in 1949, and in rather desperate circumstances, he switched to the new and burgeoning medium of television. He shifted from performer to television host and director to television producer and executive. Preferring to be known as Fred C. Bartholomew, he became the television director of independent television station WPIX in New York City from 1949 through 1954. His final acting role was as a priest in the 1951 film St. Benny the Dip.

He divorced his first wife in 1953, and in December of that year he married television chef and author Aileen Paul, whom he had met at WPIX. With her he had a daughter, Kathleen Millicent Bartholomew, born in March 1956, and a son, Frederick R. Bartholomew, born in 1958. The family, including stepdaughter Celia Ann Paul, lived in Leonia, New Jersey.
 
This was an era in which advertising firms created and produced radio and television shows. In 1954, Bartholomew began working for Benton & Bowles, a New York advertising agency, as a television producer and director. At Benton & Bowles, he produced shows such as The Andy Griffith Show, and produced or directed several television soap operas including As the World Turns, The Edge of Night and Search for Tomorrow. In 1964 he was made a vice president of radio and television at the company.

Bartholomew and his second wife divorced by early 1977. He eventually remarried in February 1976, and remained married to his third wife, Elizabeth Grabill, for the rest of his life.

Suffering from emphysema, he retired from television by the late 1980s. He eventually moved with his family to Bradenton, Florida. In 1991 he was filmed in several interview segments for the documentary film MGM: When the Lion Roars (1992). He died of heart failure in Sarasota, Florida in January 1992, at the age of 67.

Honors

On April 4, 1936, Bartholomew placed his handprints, footprints, and signature in front of Grauman's Chinese Theatre.
In 1960, he received a motion pictures star on the Hollywood Walk of Fame at 6663 Hollywood Boulevard for his contributions to the film industry.
He is one of the 250 Greatest Male Screen Legends nominated by the American Film Institute in 1999 as part of their AFI's 100 Years...100 Stars selection.

Filmography

Toyland (1930, Short)
Fascination (1931) – Child
Lily Christine (1932) – Child (uncredited)
Strip! Strip! Hooray!!! (1932, Short) – Boy (uncredited)
David Copperfield (1935) – David Copperfield as a boy
Anna Karenina (1935) – Sergei
Professional Soldier (1935) – King Peter II
Little Lord Fauntleroy (1936) – Cedric "Ceddie" Errol, Lord Fauntleroy
The Devil is a Sissy (1936) – Claude
Lloyd's of London (1936) – Jonathan Blake as a boy
Captains Courageous (1937) – Harvey Cheyne
Kidnapped (1938) – David Balfour
Lord Jeff (1938) – Geoffrey Braemer
Listen, Darling (1938) – 'Buzz' Mitchell
The Spirit of Culver (1939) – Bob Randolph
Two Bright Boys (1939) – David Harrington
Swiss Family Robinson (1940) – Jack Robinson
Tom Brown's School Days (1940) – Ned East
Naval Academy (1941) – Steve Kendall
Cadets on Parade (1942) – Austin Shannon
A Yank at Eton (1942) – Peter Carlton
Junior Army (1942) – Freddie Hewlett
The Town Went Wild (1944) – David Conway
Sepia Cinderella (1947) – Himself
St. Benny the Dip (1951) – Reverend Wilbur

Mentions in popular culture
The seven-minute Warner Bros. cartoon The Major Lied 'Til Dawn (1938) includes a caricature of Bartholomew as his Little Lord Fauntleroy role.

He was also caricatured, along with many other Hollywood celebrities, in the eight-minute 1938 Disney cartoon Mother Goose Goes Hollywood – in this case as his character from the film Captains Courageous. As in the film, Freddie falls into the sea and is saved by Spencer Tracy's character.

A non-alcoholic cocktail – a parallel of the Shirley Temple – which combines ginger ale with lime juice, known as a "Freddie Bartholomew cocktail", is named for him.

Although his name is not mentioned, he is referred to in J. D. Salinger's The Catcher in the Rye, as a figure whom Holden Caulfield looks like – specifically, Bartholomew's most iconic role as Harvey Cheyne in Captains Courageous (1937), referred to by the character Sunny as the kid in the movie "who falls off [a] boat".

References
 Hoerle, Helen. The Story of Freddie Bartholomew. Akron, Ohio: Saalfield Publishing Company, 1935.

Notes

External links

Online biography, with citations
Genealogy and birth data

Freddie Bartholomew at Virtual History

1924 births
1992 deaths
English male child actors
English male film actors
Male actors from London
American male film actors
Alumni of the Italia Conti Academy of Theatre Arts
People educated at Lord Weymouth's Grammar School
People from Leonia, New Jersey
People from Willesden
English people of Welsh descent
Metro-Goldwyn-Mayer contract players
20th-century English male actors
20th-century American male actors
English emigrants to the United States
Television producers from New Jersey